Madison Township, Ohio may refer to:

Madison Township, Butler County, Ohio
Madison Township, Clark County, Ohio
Madison Township, Columbiana County, Ohio
Madison Township, Fairfield County, Ohio
Madison Township, Fayette County, Ohio
Madison Township, Franklin County, Ohio
Madison Township, Guernsey County, Ohio
Madison Township, Hancock County, Ohio
Madison Township, Highland County, Ohio
Madison Township, Jackson County, Ohio
Madison Township, Lake County, Ohio
Madison Township, Licking County, Ohio
 Madison Township, Montgomery County, Ohio
Madison Township, Muskingum County, Ohio
Madison Township, Perry County, Ohio
Madison Township, Pickaway County, Ohio
Madison Township, Richland County, Ohio
Madison Township, Sandusky County, Ohio
Madison Township, Scioto County, Ohio
Madison Township, Vinton County, Ohio
Madison Township, Williams County, Ohio

See also
Madison Township (disambiguation)

Ohio township disambiguation pages